Miller Maza is an Anglican bishop in Nigeria: he was the Bishop of Lafia one of 13 dioceses within the Anglican Province of Abuja, itself one of 14 provinces within the Church of Nigeria.

He retired in 2017.

Notes

Living people
Anglican bishops of Lafia
21st-century Anglican bishops in Nigeria
Year of birth missing (living people)